Jonestown, Pennsylvania may refer to:

Jonestown, Columbia County, Pennsylvania, a census-designated place
Jonestown, Lebanon County, Pennsylvania, a borough
Jonestown, Schuylkill County, Pennsylvania
Jonestown, Washington County, Pennsylvania